Beryozovka 2-ya is a rural locality (a khutor) in Beryozovskoye Rural Settlement, Novoanninsky District, Volgograd Oblast, Russia. The population was 268 as of 2010. There are 5 streets.

Geography 
Beryozovka 2-ya is located in steppe on the Khopyorsko-Buzulukskaya Plain, 17 km northwest of Novoanninsky (the district's administrative centre) by road. Beryozovka 1-ya is the nearest rural locality.

References 

Rural localities in Novoanninsky District